Amandine Pierre-Louis (born February 18, 1995) is a Canadian soccer player who last played as a defender for French Division 1 Féminine club Rodez AF.

College career

West Virginia University, 2014–2017
Pierre-Louis appeared in 92 games during her four-year college career at West Virginia University. In 2016 she helped the Mountaineers reach their first College Cup Final. In her senior year in 2017 she was named Big 12 Co-Defensive Player of the Year.

During her college career, she played with the Laval Comets in the USL W-League.

Club career

Sky Blue FC, 2018–2019
Pierre-Louis was selected by Sky Blue FC with the 6th overall pick in the 2018 NWSL College Draft, she was the second Canadian selected in the first round. She was named to the final roster for the 2018 season, but due to injury has not yet appeared in a game for Sky Blue.

International career
Pierre-Louis has represented Canada at various youth levels. She was part of Canada's U-17 Team for the 2012 CONCACAF Women's Under-17 Championship and the 2012 FIFA U-17 Women's World Cup Azerbaijan. Pierre-Louis, whose father hails from Haiti, was named to Canada's team for the 2014 FIFA U-20 Women's World Cup Canada.

Pierre-Louis received her first senior Canada women's national soccer team call-up in January 2017 for a training camp in Los Angeles. Pierre-Louis has not yet been capped by Canada and still remains eligible to file a one-time switch with FIFA in order to play for Haiti, which she qualifies through her father.

References

External links
 
 
 

1995 births
Living people
Soccer players from Montreal
Canadian women's soccer players
Women's association football defenders
West Virginia Mountaineers women's soccer players
NJ/NY Gotham FC draft picks
National Women's Soccer League players
NJ/NY Gotham FC players
Canadian expatriate women's soccer players
Canadian expatriate sportspeople in France
Expatriate women's footballers in France
Black Canadian women's soccer players
Canadian sportspeople of Haitian descent
Haitian Quebecers
SK Slavia Praha (women) players
Canadian expatriate sportspeople in the Czech Republic
Expatriate women's footballers in the Czech Republic
FC Metz (women) players
Division 1 Féminine players
Czech Women's First League players
FC St-Léonard players
Laval Comets players
USL W-League (1995–2015) players